Harry Middleton (December 28, 1949 – July 28, 1993) was a southern American nature writer, most noted for his book The Earth is Enough.

Biography
Little is known about Middleton's life other than the information he offered through his novels. Middleton died in the summer of 1993 from a suspected brain aneurysm while swimming at a pool with his children. He was a garbage man at the time of his death.

He had previously worked as an outdoors columnist for Southern Living magazine , but in his book, The Bright Country, he writes off his sudden dismissal from the magazine. Prior to working at Southern Living, Middleton wrote in the early 1980s for a magazine called Louisiana Life. His column of personal observations, entitled "Louisiana At Large," included essays with titles such as "The Day the Spider Died," and "The Boy's First Brush with Education."

Middleton was an English major at Northwestern State University in Natchitoches, Louisiana, and earned a master's degree in Western history at Louisiana State University in 1973. His thesis: Frontier outpost: a history of Fort Jesup, Louisiana, 1822-1846 .

He lived in New Orleans, where he wrote about food, art, music and books for Figaro, an alternative newspaper. He later moved to Birmingham.

Middleton is widely considered to be an outstanding American fishing writer. His signed books command high prices and are collectable. His first was published in 1989.

Texts
Middleton published the following books:

Rivers of Memory, published by Pruett Publishing Company, April 1993, 112 pages.
The Earth is Enough, published by Pruett Publishing Company, March 1995, 228 pages.
On the Spine of Time, published by Simon & Schuster, March 1991, 200 pages.
The Bright Country, published by Pruett Publishing Company, October 2000, 259 pages.

Middleton also published a LTD Edition Book called "The Starlight Creek Angling Society"  Meadow Run Press.

Accomplishments
Friends of American Writers Award
Outdoor Writers Association of America Best Book Award
Southeastern Outdoor Press Best Book Award

External links
Grave information - click on number to right.
 
Search for Harry's books here.
 

1951 births
1993 deaths
20th-century American non-fiction writers
American nature writers
American male non-fiction writers
20th-century American male writers